Alice Ngayu LAI (賴雅如) is a Hong Kong artist specialized in painting and installation art.

She was born in 1976 in Hong Kong. Alice attended the University of California, Davis, USA from 1998 to 1999, and also pursued a Degree in Fine Art in Chinese from 2000. She studied at University of Leeds, MA in Fine Arts since 2006 on a Hong Kong Arts Development Council, FCO Chevening scholarships. She worked as an art administrator at Hong Kong Museum of Art and Art in Hospital after graduation.

Exhibitions

References

Hong Kong artists
1976 births
Living people
University of California, Davis alumni
Alumni of the University of Leeds
Hong Kong women artists